Taste of the Danforth is a yearly festival held in Toronto, Ontario, Canada, in the Greektown area along Danforth Avenue for a period of three days in August, spawned from the Taste of Chicago in Chicago, Illinois, United States. It is currently Canada's largest street festival. It started in 1993, and in 2013 completed its 20th year of this event which celebrates Greek food and culture. The owner of Papas Grill, a Greek cuisine on the Danforth stated Taste of the Danforth has "grown exponentially and we are still experiencing growth 20 years to the day"

This event generally occurs the second weekend of August. Past attendance numbers have been reported as high as 1.6 million people over the three-day event. Approximately 1.6 kilometres of Danforth Avenue is closed from Broadview Avenue to past Jones Avenue for the festival.

It was announced on May 15, 2020, that the 2020 festival scheduled for August 7 - 9 2020 was cancelled due to gathering restrictions of 25,000 people or more as mandated by the City of Toronto amid the global COVID-19 pandemic. It was also cancelled in 2021, and 2022.

Food and attractions
Greek food includes pork, chicken, and beef souvlaki, spanakopita, loukoumades, gyros, and roast quail. Attendees can also enjoy seated dining within the many restaurants throughout Danforth Avenue and enjoy such Greek favourites as saganaki (the "flaming" cheese), and delicious fresh Greek salads. Thousands have been coming here in recent years and they are planning to continue to go strong. Existing stores and restaurants are also open during the festival, usually opening up their stores to the streets for customers.

In addition to the Wine Garden, the 2009 Taste of The Danforth allowed attendees to enjoy four different beer gardens.

Interactive activities will be available at The Taste, including face-painting and video games.

External links
 Official website
 https://vimeo.com/72235856

References

Festivals in Toronto
Greek-Canadian culture
Toronto cuisine
Recurring events established in 1994
Food and drink festivals in Canada
Annual events in Toronto